Salvatore Toma (11 May 1951 – 17 March 1987) was an Italian poet, born in the Southern Italian region of Apulia. A visionary and passionate poet, he delved deeply into the meaning of love and death, while searching within man and nature the connection with universal consciousness. A restless soul, part of the so-called wave of the Italian accursed poets, he committed suicide in 1987 aged 35.

Born in Maglie, province of Lecce, into a family of florists, Toma attended high school, but he would not continue his studies, even though he kept researching intensely the poets he loved. During his lifetime he published six collections of poems, from 1970 to 1983.

His fame was enhanced nationally by the publication of a collection of his poems, Canzoniere della morte ("Canzoniere of Death") (Einaudi, 1999).

In 2005, Italian film director Elio Scarciglia made a documentary movie on Salvatore Toma, inclusive of testimonies and titled The Forest of Words.

Bibliography
 Poesie (Prime rondini) (Poems (First Swallows)), Rome (1970)
 Ad esempio una vacanza (For instance, a vacation), Rome (1972)
 Poesie scelte (Selected Poems), Catanzaro (1977)
 Un anno in sospeso (A Year in Suspension), Poggibonsi (1979)
 Ancora un anno (Another Year, Yet), Cavallino di Lecce (1981)
 Forse ci siamo, Lecce (1983)
 Per Salvatore Toma, poeta in esilio (For Salvatore Toma, Poet in Exile), Maglie (1997)
 Canzoniere della morte (Canzoniere of Death), Milan (1999)

Notes

External links
Article on Salvatore Toma 
Bio and poems 
The minstrel of death 
Salvatore Toma, on Scarciglia's Website. 

Italian male poets
Poètes maudits
1951 births
1987 suicides
20th-century Italian poets
20th-century Italian male writers
Suicides in Italy
People from Maglie